is a Japanese businessman who is the current Chairman and honorary CEO of Kikkoman.

Early life and career
Mogi obtained a Bachelor of Arts from Keio University in 1958 and a Master of Business Administration from Columbia Business School.  In the 1950s, Mogi helped introduce Soy Sauce to the American public by hiring chefs to create recipes that included the sauce.  He then sent the recipes to local newspapers, in an attempt to get housewives to cut them out and shop for the ingredient.  Mogi was appointed President and CEO of Kikkoman in 1995.  He previously served as President of Kikkoman.

References

Japanese chairpersons of corporations
Columbia Business School alumni
Keio University alumni
People from Noda, Chiba
Living people
1935 births
Japanese chief executives